María Luisa "Malú" Block (née Cabrera; 9 October 1904 – 1989) was a Mexican artist and arts patron.

Block was born in Coyoacán, Mexico City,  the daughter of lawyer, writer and politician Luis Cabrera Lobato and his wife, Guillermina. In 1931 she married Harry Block (1902–1975) in New York, a former liaison man between Constantin Oumansky in Washington and Vicente Lombardo Toledano in Mexico City and regular Mexican correspondent for The Nation. They had two children, named Malú and Félipe. Around 1935 the family moved from the United States to Mexico.

Malú Block was co-founder and co-financier of the Teatro Ulises.

References

1904 births
1989 deaths
20th-century Mexican painters
Mexican women painters
Place of birth missing
Place of death missing
20th-century Mexican women artists
People from Mexico City